Flight into Camden is a 1961 novel by British author and playwright David Storey. It won the 1963 Somerset Maugham Prize for fiction.

References

Storey, David.  "Flight into Camden".  1961, New York.  (9781446426135)
http://literature.britishcouncil.org/david-storey

1961 British novels
John Llewellyn Rhys Prize-winning works
Novels by David Storey
Novels set in London
London Borough of Camden
British romance novels
Longman books